Agrotis sabulosa is a moth of the family Noctuidae. It is found on the Iberian Peninsula in Europe.

The wingspan is 30–31 mm.

Description from Seitz
Forewing brownish grey, the veins blackish; a blackish blotch before  margin above middle: a black streak from base, more irregular than in endogaea Bsd.; claviform large, black: orbicular and reniform both black with grey rings: the cell black between them; hindwing pure white. — Recorded from Andalusia only; it resembles the common exclamationis, but has longer antennal pectinations.

References

External links
Fauna Europaea
lepidoptera.pl

Agrotis
Moths of Europe
Moths described in 1839